The Trịnh–Nguyễn Civil War (Hán tự: 鄭阮紛爭) was a 17th-century lengthy civil war waged between the two ruling families in Vietnam, the Trịnh lords of Đàng Ngoài and the Nguyễn lords of Đàng Trong, centered in today's Central Vietnam. The wars resulted in a long stalemate and century of peace before conflicts resumed in 1774 resulting in the emergence of the Tây Sơn forces following Trịnh Lords at the time, Nguyễn Lords collapsed in Saigon in 1777. During the division of Vietnam, Gianh River was used as the de facto border between two regimes Đàng Ngoài and Đàng Trong in peacetime.

Origins
Both the Trịnh and Nguyễn families were descended from aides, namely Trịnh Kiểm (who is a son-in-law of Nguyễn Kim) and Nguyễn Kim himself, to the hero-Emperor Lê Lợi who liberated Đại Việt from Chinese rule of Ming dynasty and started the Lê dynasty in 1428. By 1520 a succession of weak emperors had brought the country into a state of civil war (see Lê dynasty's civil war). For the next 20 years the Trịnh and Nguyễn clans fought as allies against the usurper Mạc Đăng Dung to restore Đại Việt under rule of Lê Emperor. When Lê dynasty was restored in 1533, the Mạc dynasty had to retreat to Cao Bang. Nguyễn Kim, the father of the first Nguyễn lords, married his daughter to his subordinate Trịnh Kiểm, the first of Trịnh lords. Thus the Trịnh lords and Nguyễn lords are blood related.

Partition
The prime mover in the period from 1525 onwards was Nguyen Kim. His daughter married the young head of the Trịnh family Trinh Kiem. Around 1530, the rebels of Le dynasty royalist were forced into exile in Lan Xang (modern-day Laos) but they gathered a new army and captured some southern provinces of Dai Viet. In 1545, Nguyen Kim and subsequently his eldest son Nguyen Uong were assassinated. Nguyen Kim's son-in-law, Trinh Kiem, then took control over the Royal army. In 1558, Trịnh Kiểm gave the rulership over the southernmost province of Quang Nam to Nguyen Hoang, his wife's brother and the second son of Nguyen Kim. The suspicious causes his father's and brother's deaths, as well as his brother's subsequent takover, probably caused bitter resentment in Nguyen Hoang and the later rivalry between the two families. For the next 55 years, Nguyen Hoang ruled Quang Nam. He gradually asserted his control over the province and extended his control south into the remaining Champa lands. Periodically, he sent military forces north to help the Trinh in their long fight against the Mạc dynasty. In 1570 Trinh Kiem died and was succeeded by his second son Trinh Tung, a vigorous leader who captured Hanoi from the Mạc king in 1572. However, the Mạc emperor (Mac Mau Hop) recaptured the city the next year. 20 years later in 1592, Trinh Tung again captured Hanoi and executed Mac Mau Hop. 

In 1593, Nguyen Hoang went personally to the court, bringing money and an army to help destroy the remaining Mac armies. Once the Mạc were defeated, Nguyen Hoang held the office of Grand Vizier for the next 7 years. However, his nephew Trinh Tung became increasingly wary of Nguyen Hoang's influence in the court and kept Hoàng near him at all times for surveillance purposes. Nguyen Hoang adopted Trinh Tung's two important generals as his nephews and incited them to rebel against their commander. When the rebels stormed the court, Trinh Tung fled with the Emperor while Hoàng took to the Southern Provinces, never to return. In 1600 the old Nguyen ruler broke relations with the Trinh court and titled himself as the Vuong (a term meaning prince or king). Hoang died in 1613.
The new leader of the Nguyen, Nguyen Phuc Nguyen, continued his father's policy of defiance, but also initiated friendly relations with the Europeans sailing into the area. A foreign trading post was set up in Hoi An. By 1615 the Nguyen were producing their own bronze cannons with the aid of Portuguese engineers.

The first campaign

In 1620, Nguyễn Phúc Nguyên officially refused to send taxes to the court in Hanoi. A formal demand was made to the Nguyễn to submit to the authority of the court, and it was formally refused. In 1623 Trịnh Tùng died and was succeeded by his son Trịnh Tráng. Now Trịnh Tráng made a formal demand for submission, and again Nguyễn Phúc Nguyên refused. Finally in 1627 open warfare broke out between the Trịnh and the Nguyễn. For four months a large Trịnh army battled against the Nguyễn army but were unable to defeat them.  The result of this war was that Vietnam had effectively been partitioned into northern and southern regions, with the Trịnh controlling most of the north and the Nguyễn controlling most of the south; the dividing line was the Gianh River in Quảng Bình Province. This border was very close to the Seventeenth parallel (in actuality the Bến Hải River located just to the south in Quảng Trị Province), which was imposed as the border between North Vietnam and South Vietnam during the Partition of Vietnam (1954–75). 

While the Trịnh ruled over a much more populous territory, the Nguyễn had several advantages. First, they were on the defensive. Second, the Nguyễn were able to take advantage of their contacts with the Europeans, specifically the Portuguese, to purchase advanced European weapons and hire European military experts in fortifications. Third, the geography was favorable to them, as the flat land suitable for large organized armies is very narrow at this point of Vietnam; the mountains nearly reach to the sea. 

After the first assault, the Nguyễn built two massive fortified lines which stretched a few miles from the sea to the hills. The walls were built north of Huế near the city of Đồng Hới. The Nguyễn defended these lines against numerous Trịnh offensives which lasted until 1672. The story from this time is that the great military engineer was a Vietnamese general who was hired away from the Trịnh court by the Nguyễn. This man is given the credit in Vietnam for the successful design of the Nguyễn walls. Against the walls the Trịnh mustered an army of 100,000 men, 500 elephants, and 500 large ships (Dupuy "Encyclopedia of Military History" pg. 596). The initial attacks on the Nguyễn wall were unsuccessful. The attacks lasted for several years.

Later campaigns

In 1633 the Trịnh tried an amphibious assault on the Nguyễn to get around the wall. The Trịnh fleet was defeated by the Nguyễn fleet at the battle of Nhat-Le. Around 1635 the Trịnh copied the Nguyễn and sought military aid from the Europeans. Trịnh Tráng hired the Dutch to make cannons and ships for the Royal army. In 1642–43, the Trịnh army attacked the Nguyễn walls. With the aid of the Dutch cannons, the Trịnh army broke through the first wall but failed to break through the second. At sea, the Trịnh, with their Dutch ships Kievit, Nachtegaels and Woekende Book were destroyed in a humiliating defeat by the Nguyễn fleet with their Chinese style galleys. Trịnh Tráng staged yet another offensive in 1648 but at the battle of Truong Duc, the Royal army was badly beaten by the Nguyễn. The new Lê king died around this time, perhaps as a result of the defeat. This now left the door open for the Nguyễn to finally go on the offensive.

Nguyễn offensive
The Nguyễn launched their own invasion of northern Vietnam in 1653. The Nguyễn army attacked north and defeated the weakened Royal army. Quảng Bình Province was captured. Then Hà Tĩnh Province fell to the Nguyễn army. In the following year, Trịnh Tráng died as Nguyễn forces made attacks into Nghệ An Province. Under a new Trịnh Lord, the capable Trịnh Tạc, the Royal army attacked the Nguyễn army and defeated it. The Nguyễn were fatally weakened by a division between their two top generals who refused to cooperate with each other. In 1656 the Nguyễn army was driven back all the way to their original walls. Trịnh Tạc tried to break the walls of the Nguyễn in 1661 but this attack, like so many before it, failed to break through the walls.

The end of the fight

Seventh campaign
In 1671, the Trịnh made a last effort to conquer the southern Nguyễn. They gathered a massive army of 80,000 men, the largest invasion force of the entire conflict. The attacking army was under the command of Trịnh Tạc and his son, Trịnh Căn, while the defending army was under the command of Nguyễn Phúc Tần's son Prince Nguyễn Phúc Thuận and Nguyễn Hữu Dật. The Trinh army crossed the Gianh river, then assaulted on the Xiangkhouang citadel and the Nguyen walls, but was halted by the Nguyen navy. The Trinh army lost 17,000 men within the first three days of the offensive against 25,000 Nguyen troops, which forced them to abort the attack and start peace talks. With mediation supplied by the government of the Kangxi Emperor, the Trịnh and the Nguyễn finally agreed to end the fighting by making the Linh River the border between their lands (1673). Although the Nguyễn nominally accepted the Lê King as the ruler of Vietnam, the reality was, the Nguyễn ruled the south, and the Trịnh ruled the north. This division continued for the next 100 years. The border between the Trịnh and the Nguyễn was strongly guarded but peaceful.

Conquest of Huế (1775)
The long peace came to an end in 1774. At the time, the Nguyễn were under heavy assault from Tây Sơn army and part of their force had been defeated in recent fighting in Cambodia. The result was, the army in the north defending Huế was weak. Trịnh Sâm, one of the last Trịnh Lords and ruler of the north, launched his attack on the Nguyễn on 15 November 1774. For the first time, the Nguyễn walls were broken and captured. In February 1775, the Nguyễn capital of Huế was captured by the Royal (Trịnh) army. After some fighting with the army of the Tây Sơn, a treaty was signed and the Trịnh army left the destruction of the Nguyễn to the southern rebels. A dozen years later the Trịnh Lords would be thrown out of Vietnam by the youngest and most popular of the Tây Sơn brothers.

Legacy
To fight against the larger and more powerful Imperial army under Trịnh clan, Nguyễn lords actively expanded their territory to the South into the former land of the Champa empire. They annexed much of the area that is now the southern half of Vietnam. Both sides were enthusiastic about using foreign technologies and welcoming to outsiders. From foreign traders, craftsmen, and mercenaries (mostly from Portugal, Holland, China and Japan), both sides acquired advanced civil and military technologies such as mechanics, shipbuilding and artillery construction, as well as cultural and religious elements. This long period played an important role in the formation of Vietnamese identity. 

The Dutch brought Montagnard slaves they captured from Nguyễn lord territories in Quảng Nam Province to their colony in Taiwan.

See also
 Southern and Northern Dynasties of Vietnam
 Northern and southern Vietnam
 Sino–Dutch conflicts
 Cambodian–Dutch War
 Lê–Mạc War

Citations

References

Primary sources

External links
 Coins of Vietnam - with short historical notes

Revival Lê dynasty
Wars involving Vietnam
Military history of the Dutch East India Company
Wars involving the Dutch Republic
17th century in Vietnam
17th-century conflicts